The International Graduate School in Molecular Medicine Ulm (IGradU) of Ulm University has been established in 2006 and is supported by the Excellence Initiative of the German Federal and State Governments since 2007. It promotes and supports graduate education and training in the field of biomedical research. There are two structured training programs on offer: The International PhD Programme in Molecular Medicine Ulm for doctoral candidates in the natural sciences and the program Experimental Medicine for doctoral candidates in medicine.

Scientific profile 
Molecular medicine is a research focus of Ulm University, documented by various externally funded research networks in a national and international context. The Graduate School is responsible for the training of doctoral students within these networks and beyond. It is the objective of the Graduate School to strengthen the scientific performance of Ulm University in the field of Molecular Medicine. Main areas of research cover the topics Development, Regeneration and Degeneration, Developmental and Stem Cell Biology, Aging, the Hematopoietic System and Oncology and Cardiometabolic Disorders.

International PhD Programme in Molecular Medicine 
Speaker: Prof. Dr. Michael Kühl, Institute of Biochemistry and Molecular Biology

A doctoral training program entitled International PhD Programme in Molecular Medicine was launched in October 2005. This English language postgraduate course offers a three-year structured doctorate. The training of researchers is the key task of the International PhD Programme in Molecular Medicine. The major aims in this respect are:
 to improve graduate training by creating an active, motivating, excellent and international research environment
 to foster critical thinking and acting, creativity and personal responsibility
 to encourage graduates to develop their own ideas, discuss them in an open forum and to convert them into meaningful action
 to generate an international environment within which students can work with tolerance and respect for people from different cultural backgrounds
 to encourage graduates to carry out independent scientific research by adopting a multilevel supervision and mentoring approach
 to guide graduate education by establishing a definitive and transparent program structure 
 to advance graduate career opportunities in the academic world and in industry.

Each doctoral student is supervised by a Thesis Advisory Committee (TAC) consisting of three members. The TAC supervises PhD students in their daily laboratory work, monitors the progress of their work and evaluates oral examinations as well as the written dissertation. This multiple supervision approach supports the independence of the PhD students as young researchers.

The International PhD Programme in Molecular Medicine is taught entirely in English. During the three-year period of studies, students must take part in a number of compulsory activities. Central teaching activities include the lecture Improve your Textbook Knowledge as well as a Journal Club and the biweekly seminar Progress Report. The lecture Improve your Textbook Knowledge allows graduates from different disciplines to refresh the basic knowledge needed to perform research in molecular medicine independently of their scientific background. In the seminar Progress Report, students are trained to communicate and present their own research data to their fellow students and to place it in a broader international context. Furthermore, graduates must attend a series of lectures presented by external speakers. Another compulsory course is the seminar Good Scientific Practice which takes place at the beginning of practical work.

In addition to curricular seminars and lectures, PhD students are offered a variety of optional activities, like organized excursions to pharmaceutical and biotech companies. Summer schools and other scientific events in cooperation with international partner universities and partners from industry motivate students to deepen their knowledge in basic science and practical applications. Furthermore, scientific retreats focusing on particular research topics are offered. In addition, there are competence seminars organized in order to improve the employability of the graduates.

At present, up to 66% of the doctoral candidates of the Graduate School are female. Therefore, special initiatives have been adopted for female students and doctoral students with children. The gender program provides among others financial support for child day care, practical help with finding the right day care and supports the participation in a Mentoring-Program (MuT) for junior female academics. Furthermore, the Graduate School finances technical assistants who conduct experiments for pregnant students. This enables female students to continue their PhD work during pregnancy. Re-entry fellowships are provided for doctoral students who had to interrupt their work due to maternity leave.

Within the first two years of doctoral training, students are also expected to attend three practical training sessions in different laboratories or in industry. This allows them to learn new and innovative techniques that go beyond their own research field and to establish contact to possible employers.

A particular element of the training concept are the two intermediate examinations that students must pass on completion of their first and second years of study. Both exams take place during international meetings held in April and October of each year and consist of a poster presentation and/or a public talk. Through their public frame the exams help to actively integrate the graduates into the international scientific community and to ensure proper progress in the scientific project. PhD Students have the chance to seek advice from professional international scientists.

At the end of PhD studies, students can obtain the German degree Doctor rerum naturalium (Dr. rer. nat.) or the international degree Doctor of Philosophy (PhD). The opportunity for graduates to choose their degrees is a unique feature of the Medical Faculty and the Graduate School at Ulm University.

The admission regulations stipulate clear criteria for selection: above average degree (MSc, state exam); proof of proficiency in English; a scientific presentation before members of the faculty; and individual interviews with supervisors and members of the examination board.

Program Experimental Medicine 
Speaker: Prof. Dr. Thomas Wirth, Institute of Physiological Chemistry

In 2005, in order to combat deficiencies in the supervision and quality of medical theses, the Medical Faculty implemented the structured training program Experimental Medicine, which was subsequently adopted by the Graduate School in 2009. The requirement for entry is an above-average intermediate examination (part one of the national medical licensing exam). Doctoral candidates must interrupt their studies in medicine for nine months in order to concentrate fully on their experimental work. The Medical Faculty supports this program with 25 stipends yearly including the study fee. Doctoral candidates submit reports on their research work in the program's seminars in addition to giving presentations of up-to-date scientific literature in a Journal Club.

Integration of DFG Research Training Groups 
The German Research Foundation (DFG) set up two Research Training Groups on biomedical topics at Ulm University:

 Research Training Group 1041: Molecular Diabetology and Endocrinology in Medicine (established in 2004)
 Research Training Group 1789: CEMMA: Cellular and Molecular Mechanisms in Aging (established in 2013)

This DFG funding scheme has been established to qualify doctoral researchers within the framework of a focused research program and a structured training strategy. While the research programs of the research training groups and the graduate school complement one another, the groups are fully integrated into the graduate school organizationally. Applications are processed by the graduate school, and the doctoral students have full access to the graduate school's activities, services and degrees.

International partner institutions 
Since its foundation in 2006, the Graduate School has established close cooperation with the following international partner institutions:
  Barts and Queen Mary's College in London, UK
  Biocenter Oulu, Finland
      Harvard Medical School in Boston, USA
    Huazhong University of Science and TechnologyTongji Medical College in Wuhan, China
      University of Houston, USA
    University of Padua, Italy
      University of North Carolina at Chapel Hill, USA
    Università 'Campus Bio-Medico' di Roma, Italy
    Universitat autònoma de Barcelona, Spain
  University of Oulu, Finland Lund University, Sweden (joint PhD program)

See also 
 City of Ulm
 Ulm University
 German Research Foundation
 German Universities Excellence Initiative
 List of Graduate Schools funded by the Excellence Initiative

References

External links 
 International Graduate School in Molecular Medicine Ulm
 Biannual Report 2011 of the International Graduate School in Molecular Medicine Ulm
 Graduate School on Facebook
 Graduate School on the DFG Video Portal on the Excellence Initiative
 Ulm University

Educational institutions established in 2006
University of Ulm
Education in Baden-Württemberg
Medical research institutes in Germany
Medical and health organisations based in Baden-Württemberg
2006 establishments in Germany